Shchedryk may refer to:
 "Shchedryk" (song), a traditional Ukrainian song, the source of the tune of the English-language Christmas carol "Carol of the Bells"
 Shchedryk (choir), a professional Ukrainian Children's Choir
 Shchedryk (film), а Ukrainian historical drama film directed by Olesia Morhunets-Isaienko.